Cristian Urbistondo López (born 14 August 1979), known as Txiki, is a Spanish footballer who plays as a central defender for UD Los Garres.

Club career
Born in Barcelona, Catalonia, Txiki spent the vast majority of his extensive senior career in the lower leagues, starting out at CE Europa in his native region. From 2009 to 2013 he competed in the Segunda División, in representation of FC Cartagena and Girona FC.

After winning promotion with Cartagena, Txiki made his professional league debut on 29 August 2009, playing the entire 1–0 away win against Girona and being booked. He scored the first of two goals in the second tier on 7 February 2010, in a 3–2 victory at Rayo Vallecano.

In Segunda División B, Txiki appeared for CE Sabadell FC (two spells), Girona, CD Villanueva, AD Ceuta and CD Teruel, signing for the latter club at the age of 39.

References

External links

1979 births
Living people
Footballers from Barcelona
Spanish footballers
Association football defenders
Segunda División players
Segunda División B players
Tercera División players
CE Europa footballers
CE Sabadell FC footballers
Girona FC players
AD Ceuta footballers
FC Cartagena footballers
Mar Menor FC players
CD Teruel footballers